Ghar Banduk Biryani is an upcoming Indian Marathi-language film directed by Hemant Jangal Awtade in his directorial debut. Produced by Zee Studios and Nagraj Popatrao Manjule. The film stars Akash Thosar, Sayli Patil, Sayaji Shinde and Nagraj Manjule in lead roles. It is scheduled to be theatrically released on 7 April 2023.

Cast 

 Akash Thosar 
 Sayli Patil
 Sayaji Shinde
 Nagraj Manjule
Tanaji Galgunde 
Somnath Awghade
Pravin Dalimbkar
Priyanshu Chetri/Babu
Shwetambari Ghute 
Suraj Pawar
Subhash Kambale
Vitthal Nagnath Kale
Niraj Jamgade
Santosh Vitthalrao Vhadgir (Naik)
Lalit Matale
Kiran Pralhad Thoke
Kishore Nilewad 
Girish Krishnat Koravi
Charan Jadhav
Ashish Khachane
Ashok Prabhakar Kangude

Production

Development  
The first teaser of Ghar Banduk Biryani was uploaded on YouTube on 15 October 2021 by Aatpat Production and the second teaser was uploaded on 25 October 2022 in Hindi by Zee Studios as well as Aatpat Production. The film was initially slated to release on March 30, 2023, but it was pushed to April 7, 2023 due to the release date of Bholaa on the same day. Apart from Marathi, the film will also be released in Hindi, Tamil and Telugu languages.

Release

Theatrical 
The film is scheduled to theatrically released on 7 April 2023 in Marathi, Hindi, Tamil and Telugu languages.

Home media 
The digital streaming rights of the film are acquired by ZEE5.

Soundtrack 
AV Prafullachandra has given music and background score for this film.

Marathi

Hindi

Tamil

Telugu

References

External links 

 
 Ghar Banduk Biryani

2023 films
Upcoming Indian films